Adelbert Hall is an administration building at Case Western Reserve University in Cleveland, Ohio and a registered historic building, listed in the National Register on 1973-10-30.

Construction 
It was built in 1881 to serve as the home of Western Reserve College and named after Adelbert Stone, the son of industrialist Amasa Stone. The building was gutted by a fire in June 1991, and a $12.4 million restoration of the building was completed in 1993 during the tenure of President Agnar Pytte.

References

External links

University and college buildings completed in 1881
Buildings and structures in Cleveland
Case Western Reserve University
School buildings on the National Register of Historic Places in Ohio
University and college administration buildings in the United States
National Register of Historic Places in Cleveland, Ohio
University Circle
1881 establishments in Ohio